Ryland Heights is a home rule-class city in Kenton County, Kentucky, in the United States. The population was 1,022 at the 2010 census, up from 799 at the 2000 census. It is part of the Cincinnati metropolitan area.

Geography
Ryland Heights is located at  (38.965979, -84.470914) in eastern Kenton County. It is bordered to the east by the Licking River, which forms the Campbell County line. Neighboring cities are Independence and Covington to the west, Fairview to the northwest, and Taylor Mill to the north. Kentucky Route 177 passes through the community, leading north  to downtown Covington and south  to Butler.

Demographics

As of the census of 2000, there were 799 people, 293 households, and 225 families residing in the city. The racial makeup of the city was 97.87% White, 0.38% African American, 0.63% Native American, 0.13% from other races, and 1.00% from two or more races. Hispanic or Latino of any race were 0.50% of the population.

There were 293 households, out of which 29.7% had children under the age of 18 living with them, 64.2% were married couples living together, 7.5% had a female householder with no husband present, and 23.2% were non-families. 19.5% of all households were made up of individuals, and 6.8% had someone living alone who was 65 years of age or older. The average household size was 2.73 and the average family size was 3.13.

In the city, the population was spread out, with 24.3% under the age of 18, 7.9% from 18 to 24, 29.2% from 25 to 44, 27.5% from 45 to 64, and 11.1% who were 65 years of age or older. The median age was 39 years. For every 100 females, there were 105.4 males. For every 100 females age 18 and over, there were 104.4 males.

The median income for a household in the city was $48,077, and the median income for a family was $55,781. Males had a median income of $35,938 versus $27,083 for females. The per capita income for the city was $19,043. About 5.7% of families and 8.7% of the population were below the poverty line, including 9.6% of those under age 18 and 9.2% of those age 65 or over.

References

Cities in Kenton County, Kentucky
Cities in Kentucky